"Yours If You Want It" is a song recorded by American country music group Rascal Flatts. It was released in January 2017 as the first single from their tenth studio album, Back to Us (2017). The song was written by Andrew Dorff and Jonathan Singleton.

History
Rascal Flatts bassist Jay DeMarcus noted that the song was co-written by Andrew Dorff, who died at age 40 shortly before the song was released. He told Rolling Stone that "We've been working really hard and we're very proud of this track and what's more, the late Andrew Dorff is a writer on it, and we are so honored to be a small part of making sure his legacy lives on. We have a special angel watching over it, for sure."

Music video
The music video was directed by Billy Zabka, starring Kevin Farley and Kristy Swanson, and premiered on CMT, GAC and Vevo in April 2017. Zabka previously directed Rascal Flatts' music video for "Why Wait".

Critical reception
Billy Dukes of Taste of Country reviewed the song with favor, saying that "The production of 'Yours If You Want It' is as important as LeVox’s sterling vocals. Every instrument and backing vocal is razor sharp, yet there's no phony shine that often accompanies a heavily produced track. Visit Jay DeMarcus and Joe Don Rooney's simple and well-balanced backing vocals for an example." Matt Bjorke of Roughstock was also favorable, comparing the sound favorably to the band's earlier songs such as "Prayin' for Daylight" while noting the "modern and fresh" production.

Commercial performance
The song has sold 88,000 copies in the United States as of June 2017.

Charts
For the week ending August 5, 2017, the song became the group's fourteenth and final number one single on Billboard Country Airplay. Following previous single "I Like the Sound of That," this marked the first time since 2009 (with "Here" and "Here Comes Goodbye") that the group achieved consecutive number one hits on the Country Airplay chart.

Year-end charts

References

2017 songs
2017 singles
Rascal Flatts songs
Big Machine Records singles
Songs written by Andrew Dorff
Songs written by Jonathan Singleton